The Dominion of Canada General Insurance Company, operating as The Dominion, was a Canadian general insurance company in operation from 1887 to 2013. The Dominion’s head office was in Toronto and the company had various offices across Canada. 

The Dominion’s first president was Sir John A. Macdonald, Canada's first prime minister. In 2009, the company created the first championship for club curlers in Canada, known as The Dominion Curling Club Championship. In 2013, the Dominion was acquired by US insurer The Travelers Companies.  Upon completion of the acquisition on November 1, it became part of Travelers' subsidiary Travelers Canada. The final Chief Executive Officer was Brigid Murphy, who then became President and CEO of the new Travelers Canada.

See also
John A. Macdonald
The Dominion Curling Club Championship

References

Defunct insurance companies of Canada
Financial services companies established in 1887
Companies based in Toronto
1887 establishments in Ontario
Financial services companies disestablished in 2013
2013 disestablishments in Ontario
2013 mergers and acquisitions
The Travelers Companies
Canadian companies established in 1887